Sverigeflyg was the main brand for the seven Swedish regional airlines Blekingeflyg, FlySmaland, Golden Air, Gotlandsflyg, Kalmarflyg, Kullaflyg, and Sundsvallsflyg. The actual air operator of all of their flights however was Braathens Regional. In March 2016, Sverigeflyg and Malmö Aviation merged into the new BRA Braathens Regional Airlines.

History
Sverigeflyg was founded in 2001 by Chairman of the board Pigge Werkelin and CEO Michael Juniwik, both from Gotland. In 2011 the majority of the shares in Sverigeflyg was bought by Braathens Aviation. Sverigeflyg was part of ELFAA.

Destinations

The following routes were offered by Sverigeflyg's brands as of December 2015:

Finland
Helsinki - Helsinki Airport (Summer)

Sweden
Gothenburg - Göteborg Landvetter Airport
Halmstad - Halmstad Airport
Kalmar - Kalmar Airport
Malmö - Malmö Airport
Mora - Mora Airport (Winter)
Norrköping - Norrköping Airport (Summer)
Ronneby - Ronneby Airport
Stockholm - Stockholm-Bromma Airport
Sundsvall - Sundsvall Airport
Trollhättan - Trollhättan-Vänersborg Airport
Umeå - Umeå Airport (Summer)
Visby - Visby Airport
Växjö - Växjö Airport
Ängelholm - Ängelholm-Helsingborg Airport

Fleet

As of December 2015 the Sverigeflyg fleet consisted of the following aircraft:

See also
 Airlines
 Transport in Sweden

References

External links 

Defunct airlines of Sweden
Airlines disestablished in 2016